The Reputation Stadium Tour was the fifth concert tour by American singer-songwriter Taylor Swift, in support of her sixth studio album Reputation (2017). The all-stadium tour began on May 8, 2018, in Glendale, Arizona, and concluded on November 21, 2018, in Tokyo, consisting of 53 shows. The tour received 2.88 million attendees and grossed $345.7 million in revenue. It marked Swift's most successful tour to-date, and broke many boxscore records, such as becoming the third highest-grossing female concert tour of all time, and the highest-grossing tour ever in the United States and North America.

Reflecting themes of Reputation, the concept of the Reputation Stadium Tour incorporated Goth subculture, Broadway theatricality and snake motifs. It featured a main stage, with a wedge-shaped display resembling a skyscraper under construction, and two smaller stages. The tour received universal acclaim from contemporary critics and journalists, who commonly labeled it the best concert tour of 2018 and Swift's best tour yet, praising her stage presence, wardrobe, and versatile performances. They described it as a "hyper-maximalist" tour with high-tech production value. The tour has received several "Tour of the Year" accolades. Mark Dayton, Governor of Minnesota (2011–2019), declared August 31, 2018, as "Taylor Swift Day" in the state, honoring Swift's two consecutive dates (August 31 and September 1) at the U.S. Bank Stadium in Minneapolis. He stated that "through her personal and honest music, Taylor Swift has energized and inspired not only Minnesotans, but people all over the world, and is a positive influence on her fans through her example of truthfulness, grace, extensive philanthropy, and strength of character".

The October 6 show at AT&T Stadium in Arlington, Texas, was recorded and released as a Netflix-original concert film of the same name on December 31st.

Development
In August 2017, Billboard reported that Swift would be using Ticketmaster's Verified Fan program to prevent bots and ticket scalpers from purchasing tickets. The program, named "Taylor Swift Tix", allowed fans to purchase tickets in advance of the public on-sale by participating in boost activities to increase chances of getting a pre-sale access code. On November 13, 2017, Swift's management announced the first round of dates for the tour jointly with Ticketmaster. Tickets went on sale to the general public on December 13, 2017, Swift's 28th birthday.

In late November, Swift announced shows in Manchester, Dublin, and London. Due to overwhelming demand, additional dates were announced for all three cities. Furthermore, the singer also announced extra shows in North America for Pasadena, Chicago, East Rutherford, Foxborough, Toronto, and Atlanta due to popular demand before the pre-sale began. On December 3, Swift announced five dates for Oceania. In January 2018, due to huge demand, Swift went on to add second dates in Santa Clara, Landover, Philadelphia, Minneapolis and Arlington and third dates in East Rutherford and Foxborough, totalling 40 shows for the tour's North American leg.

On March 1, 2018, Swift officially announced Camila Cabello and Charli XCX as the opening acts for the Reputation Stadium Tour. Cabello was previously speculated as the opening act because her Never Be the Same Tour dates did not coincide with Swift's tour dates; Portland's Live 95.5 also announced her in a sweepstake for the concert of June 22, 2018, at Wembley Stadium in London through a since-deleted post on Twitter, a day before Swift confirmed her as the opening act.

On May 7, 2018, the day before the tour kicked off at Glendale, Arizona, Swift invited 2,000 foster and adopted children to a private dress rehearsal. The following day, she announced two shows in Tokyo in partnership with Fujifilm Instax, with Charli XCX as the opening act. In September, Broods was announced as an opening act for the Oceania leg of the tour.

During the shows, Swift performed many "surprise songs" as part of an acoustic segment at different concerts. The "surprise songs" varied according to venues, and were taken from Swift's back catalog. A streaming-exclusive compilation playlist, Reputation Stadium Tour Surprise Song Playlist, was released to digital music platforms on November 30, 2018.

Critical reception
The tour received rave reviews from critics, being commonly labeled as the best of Swift's career thus far and the best tour of 2018. The concerts were complimented for Swift's on-stage persona and intimacy with the audience, the versatile set list and the transition between songs, production value, the stripped-down performances and wardrobe choices, with many commentators noting the Gothic visuals and costumes, and the Broadway theatricality of the show.

Stereogums Chris DeVille deemed it a "hyper-maximalist" tour and "a perpetual gargantuan flex, a roving musical Infinity War that amplifies everything extra about her persona to an exponential scope" and added that it is designed to be "the biggest spectacle in all of summer entertainment". He also described the tour as "an oversized, high-tech touring Broadway production with a mostly tremendous soundtrack" and concluded that "when discussing the biggest artists of her [Swift's] generation, she's undeniably on the shortlist" and that the singer has ascended to the same "rarefied" tier as the "classic rock deities who've echoed across this venue [the Horseshoe] before her, able to keep commanding stadium status for the rest of her career". Rob Sheffield of Rolling Stone named the tour as Swift's "most astounding tour yet" and complimented it for giving "it all the vibe of a mass communion" despite aiming for "maximum stadium-rock razzle-dazzle bombast". He observed the acoustic performances of Swift's fan-favorite deep cuts and dubbed them "a powerhouse performance that made all the different Taylors sound like part of the same story".

The Guardians Bob Gordon thought that "...Ready for It?" is "an appropriate and compelling opener". He opined that Swift made a "striking entrance" with "no elevation or descent, simply walking out from behind a curtain bathed in brilliant white light, in what was a real 'now I'm here' moment, as Freddie Mercury would once have put it". Awarding the tour five stars, Roisin O'Connor of The Independent lauded the set-list and how it "transitions seamlessly from one song to another, crafted out of some of the best from Swift's canon". Also, she compared the tour to a Broadway show, because the stage was "flooded with red lighting and dancers swing from trapeze with all the splendour of a Broadway show". Lydia Burgham of The Spinoff defined the tour's Auckland concert a "theatrical, mega-production that somehow also strips down to raw intimate moments". Commenting on the set-list, she noted that Swift "had the crowd aching for more with the commencement of every song, thanks to seamless transitions". Burgham highlighted the intimacy of Swift's acoustic guitar and piano performances that proved Swift remaining "integral to her singer-songwriter origins". She summarized her review by stating that "there may not be an artist in this lifetime who quite manages to connect to thousands of people on a rainy night as well as Taylor Swift can – and that's the reputation she will be remembered for".

Varietys Chris Willman wrote that the show "had plenty of fierceness, especially in the early going" but also the "pre-decedent Taylor on the line… the guileless Swift we remember from two or three skins ago", and commended Swift for using her two hours on the stage to "paint a rewardingly holistic picture". Willman believed that, despite the huge production, "we're still left not so much with dragons or defensiveness but in the endearingly earnest presence of pop's most approachable superstar". He further remarked that the acoustic performance of "Dancing With Our Hands Tied" proved that Reputation worked acoustically as well, without the "Max Martin-izing". Randy Lewis of Los Angeles Times wrote that Swift gave "a master class in the constructive use of the modern technology that's allowed her to establish and nurture an exceptionally powerful connection with a massive audience." He underlined the use of light-up bracelets that allowed the attendees "to feel like participants, even collaborators, rather than passive observers" and appreciated the stage's resemblance to "a skyscraper in progress, with six crane-like contraptions stretching up above a wedge-like screen". Lewis summarized the show as "tightly structured for the most part, featuring elaborate production numbers that rely on video projection, eye-popping lighting and pyrotechnics, choreography and precisely coordinated interaction among the star, band, singers and dancers".

Reviewing for V Magazine, Greg Krelenstein stated that Swift possesses "a rare gift of turning a stadium spectacle into an intimate setting", with the new persona the singer adopted on Reputation album cycle suiting itself "excellently to a show of this magnitude where she appears larger than life". He thought that Swift fully embraced her vast back catalog and praised her command of the stage—"whether plucking a guitar or leading an army of dancers" that showed that Swift's musical and performance evolution is an "absolute success". Krelenstein concluded that the pop star "delivers in every way to a mesmerized and devoted audience, re-defining what the modern stadium tour can be". Ed Masley, from The Arizona Republic, wrote that "there were many moments in the course Swift's performance that felt like she was playing to the back rows of the stadium by simply sharing with her fans", while complimenting the tour's production and Swift's connection with the crowd. Jim Harrington of The Mercury News asserted that the singer's vocal work and performance skills have improved over the years, and added that "her game is well-rounded enough that she can excel equally at every different aspect of the show." Chris Tuite, from CBS San Francisco, wrote: "The only thing more prominent than the singer herself during her current costume-change filled spectacle are the massive, vicious looking snakes that symbolically appear throughout the set." Michael Tritsch from 303 Magazine raved that the tour "broke new ground and set the bar high for future stadium tours", burning "its way into the history books".

Commercial performance

Ticket sales
After four days of sales through the Verified Fan platform and three days of sales to the general public that began December 13, the tour had already grossed $180 million from 33 dates in North America alone. Pollstar reported data supplied by the Gridiron Stadium Network, a consortium of NFL facilities that work together to book concerts at their buildings, which showed at least 35,000 tickets had been sold at ten of the stadiums on the route as of December 18. The tickets sold ranged from 35,419 at Heinz Field in Pittsburgh to a high of 48,039 at Lincoln Financial Field in Philadelphia. With more than 47,000 tickets sold, it was reported the May 12, 2018, date at Levi's Stadium in Santa Clara was generating close to $9 million in ticket revenue, which prompted the addition of an extra date.

According to StubHub, the tour is the best-selling female tour in the United Kingdom in 2018.

Boxscore
The first seven shows of the tour grossed $54 million with 390,000 tickets sold, leading Swift to the top of Billboards Hot Tours chart in June 2018. She performed to sold-out crowds of 59,157 in Glendale and 107,550 in Santa Clara (over two nights), grossing $7.21 million and $14 million respectively, while the Pasadena shows combined for a gross of nearly $16.3 million and Seattle accounted more than $8.6 million. The concerts in Louisville and Columbus, reported in July 2018, grossed $11.5 million with around 115,000 tickets sold, with the latter city having the highest gross and most tickets sold, with approximately 63,000 tickets and $6.6 million. These concerts led the singer once again to the top of Hot Tours chart.

Records

The tour has broken multiple venue attendance and grossing records. The debut performance at University of Phoenix Stadium set new venue records in both gross and attendance, topping Metallica's $5.2 million gross earned in August 2017 by almost $2 million. With 59,157 tickets sold, she also broke the attendance record set during One Direction's Where We Are Tour in 2014 by 2,633 seats. With a $14 million take from 107,550 sold tickets at Levi's Stadium she topped her own gross and attendance counts set during The 1989 World Tour in 2015. With more than 118,000 fans in attendance at the Rose Bowl, the two-show run earned $16.2 million and set a new gross record for a single headliner at the venue, surpassing U2's 2017 record by over $467,000. Grossing records previously set by U2 as well were broken at Seattle's CenturyLink Field, where she topped their Joshua Tree Tour 2017 gross by $2.4 million, and Denver's Sports Authority Field at Mile High, where she surpassed the $6.6 million gross set by the band in 2011 during their 360° Tour by $1.2 million.

Swift made history by becoming the first ever female artist to headline Dublin's Croke Park twice, with reportedly 136,000 fans in attendance. Similarly, she achieved the milestone of becoming the first woman to headline three consecutive nights at MetLife Stadium and Gillette Stadium.

Following the tour's 29th show in North America at Hard Rock Stadium in Miami, it had grossed $202.3 million in the continent ($191.1 million in the United States and $11.1 million in Canada) thus breaking Swift's own record of the highest grossing North American tour by a female artist, previously held by The 1989 World Tour, with fewer dates. Nevertheless, the tour eventually broke the record set by The Rolling Stones' A Bigger Bang Tour, to become the highest-grossing tour in US and North American history, grossing $266.1 million, besting the Stones' $245 million gross. The Stones achieved their then-record from 70 American shows, while Swift did it with just 38 shows. Additionally, the tour holds the Guinness World Record for 2018's highest-grossing tour by a female artist.

Awards

Set list
This set list is from the concert on May 8, 2018, in Glendale, Arizona. It is not intended to represent all shows from the tour.

 "...Ready for It?"
 "I Did Something Bad"
 "Gorgeous"
 "Style" / "Love Story" / "You Belong with Me"
 "Look What You Made Me Do"
 "End Game"
 "King of My Heart"
 "Delicate"
 "Shake It Off" 
 "Dancing with Our Hands Tied"
 All Too Well
 "Blank Space"
 "Dress"
 "Bad Blood" / "Should've Said No"
 "Don't Blame Me"
 "Long Live" / "New Year's Day"
 "Getaway Car"
 "Call It What You Want"
 "We Are Never Ever Getting Back Together" / "This Is Why We Can't Have Nice Things"

Notes

 During the first show in Landover, the second show in Philadelphia, the third show in East Rutherford, the third show in Foxborough, the second show in Toronto, and the second show in Tokyo, Swift performed "So It Goes..." in place of "Dancing with Our Hands Tied".
 During the second show in Philadelphia, Swift performed "Our Song" and "Wildest Dreams" a cappella after the levitating basket stage used during "Delicate" malfunctioned.
 During the second show in East Rutherford, Swift performed "Clean" before the "Long Live" / "New Year's Day" medley.

Surprise songs

The following songs were performed by Swift in place of "All Too Well":

 Santa Clara (first show) and Tokyo (second show): "Wildest Dreams"
 Santa Clara (second show): "The Best Day"
 Pasadena: "Red"
 Seattle: "Holy Ground"
 Denver: "Teardrops on My Guitar"
 Chicago (first show): "Our Song"
 Chicago (second show), Foxborough (first show), Sydney: "22"
 Manchester (first show), Perth: "I Knew You Were Trouble"
 Manchester (second show): "I Don't Wanna Live Forever"
 Dublin (first show): "Mean"
 Dublin (second show): "How You Get the Girl"
 London (first show): "So It Goes..."
 London (second show): "Fifteen"
 Louisville: "Mine"
 Columbus: "Sparks Fly"
 Landover (first show): "State of Grace"
 Landover (second show): "Haunted"
 Philadelphia (first show): "Never Grow Up"
 Philadelphia (second show): "Treacherous"
 Cleveland: "Babe"
 East Rutherford (first show): "Welcome to New York"
 East Rutherford (second show): "Fearless"
 East Rutherford (third show): "Enchanted"
 Foxborough (second show): "Change"
 Foxborough (third show): "Ours"
 Toronto (first show), Auckland: "Out of the Woods"
 Toronto (second show): "Come Back... Be Here"
 Pittsburgh: "A Place in This World"
 Atlanta (first show): "This Love"
 Atlanta (second show): "The Lucky One"
 Tampa: "Invisible"
 Miami Gardens: "Breathe"
 Nashville: "Better Man"
 Detroit: "Jump Then Fall"
 Minneapolis (first show): "Begin Again"
 Minneapolis (second show): "Tied Together with a Smile"
 Kansas City: "The Story of Us"
 Indianapolis: "Forever & Always"
 St. Louis: "Hey Stephen"
 New Orleans: "Speak Now"
 Houston: "Wonderland"
 Arlington (first show): "White Horse"
 Melbourne: "I'm Only Me When I'm with You"
 Brisbane: "Starlight"
 Tokyo (first show): "I Know Places"

Special guests

Swift surprised fans throughout the tour with special guests, performing a duet with them.
 May 18, 2018 – Pasadena: "There's Nothing Holdin' Me Back" with Shawn Mendes.
 May 19, 2018 – Pasadena: "My My My!" with Troye Sivan; "Hands to Myself" with Selena Gomez.
 June 22, 2018 – London: "Slow Hands" with Niall Horan.
 June 23, 2018 – London: "Angels" with Robbie Williams.
 July 26, 2018 – Foxborough: "Curious" with Hayley Kiyoko.
 August 4, 2018 – Toronto: "Summer of '69" with Bryan Adams.
 August 25, 2018 – Nashville: "Tim McGraw" with Tim McGraw and Faith Hill.
 October 5, 2018 – Arlington: "The Middle" with Maren Morris.
 October 6, 2018 – Arlington: "Babe" with Sugarland.

Concert film

Taylor Swift: Reputation Stadium Tour is a concert film directed by Paul Dugdale. It was released on December 31, 2018, exclusively via Netflix. The film follows American singer-songwriter Taylor Swift's second performance at AT&T Stadium in Arlington, Texas on her record-breaking fifth headlining concert tour, the Reputation Stadium Tour.

Swift announced on social media on her birthday, December 13, that the concert film would be released globally in partnership with Netflix on New Year's Eve. It was filmed on the last day of the North American leg of the tour. For their work on the film, Tamlyn Wright and Baz Halpin were nominated in the category "Variety, Reality or Event Special" at the 24th Art Directors Guild Annual Excellence in Production Design Awards.

Critical reception
The film received widespread critical acclaim upon release, with many critics labeling the film as "immortalizing" and "unforgettable". The commentators praised the camerawork from director Paul Dugdale for documenting Swift's "stardom", the crowd's emotions, and the production involved in the concert. Rolling Stones Rob Sheffield wrote that the film "immortalizes her best tour yet" and that the film shows off "the stadium-rocking spectacle without toning down any of her songs' one-on-one emotional intimacy". Describing the Netflix special as "the end of an era", Amanda Petrusich of The New Yorker  opined that the film "will soon either be regarded as a museum piece or as a testament to Swift's era-defying longevity".

Billboards Denis Warner stated that the film "illuminates the singer's power, dedication, and strength as an artist". He further stated that the film "allows you to get more of a feel of the singer as a performer – and experience just how delicately everything is staged" and appreciated Swift for giving "a gorgeous look into her [Swift's] world as one of today's greatest entertainers". Deciders Benjamin Smith called the film as an "intimate document of an impersonal event". He further expanded that Swift "will stand the test of time more than her fellow early 21st century pop queens", stating the reason "Taylor Swift is perhaps the only one who has figured out a way to turn her music into something more than mere pop". Complimenting Swift's connection with her fans, Nardin Saad of Los Angeles Times stated that "the 10-time Grammy-winner's star power is tantamount as evidenced" in the film.

Katie Collins of CNET opined that the film "serves as a reminder that no matter what else happens, Swift's stardom is perennial" and praised the film for "the divine showcase of the costumes, the dancing and especially Swift's own barely-contained effervescent joy at being on stage". She further complimented the camerawork, stating "closeups brought new insights" into the show. Nicholas Hautman of Us Weekly appreciated the camerawork for depicting "the fans hysterically crying and screaming in support of their idol". Writing for Uproxx, Chloe Gilke labelled the film as a "masterful documentation of the magical energy at a pop show" and as "a love letter to the audience at her shows, and to her fans", while stating that the film "honors the sacred joy of her [Swift's] performance that night, and the people who made it happen". She lauded the camerawork for capturing "the massive scope of the production from every angle," and the audio which "is crystal-clear and beautiful, with the crowd quieted down so viewers at home can hear Swift best."

Performances
Nineteen songs were performed in the following order in the film:

 "...Ready for It?"
 "I Did Something Bad"
 "Gorgeous"
 "Style" / "Love Story" / "You Belong with Me"
 "Look What You Made Me Do"
 "End Game"
 "King of My Heart"
 "Delicate"
 "Shake It Off" 
 "Dancing with Our Hands Tied"
 "All Too Well"
 "Blank Space"
 "Dress"
 "Bad Blood" / "Should've Said No"
 "Don't Blame Me"
 "Long Live" / "New Year's Day"
 "Getaway Car"
 "Call It What You Want"
 "We Are Never Ever Getting Back Together" / "This Is Why We Can't Have Nice Things"

Shows

Notes

See also 
 List of highest-grossing concert tours
 List of original films distributed by Netflix

References

External links

 Official website Events

2018 concert tours
Taylor Swift concert tours
Concert tours of North America
Concert tours of Europe
Concert tours of Oceania
Concert tours of Asia
Concert tours of the United States
Concert tours of the United Kingdom
Concert tours of Ireland
Concert tours of Canada
Concert tours of Australia
Concert tours of New Zealand
Concert tours of Japan